Huddle House, Inc. is an American casual dining franchisor. There are 339 units in 23 different states, with a concentration in the southeast United States.

History
The chain was started in April 1964 in Decatur, Georgia by John Sparks, with the goal of providing a 24-hour eatery. It is named after the act of huddling in football. The original Huddle House in Decatur was established to give fans a place to eat after "the big game" on Friday nights.

In 2006, Allied Capital acquired Huddle House for $124.1 million.

In 2009, Ares Capital acquired Allied Capital.

In April 2012, Ares sold Huddle House to Sentinel Capital Partners.

In February 2018, Sentinel Capital Partners sold Huddle House to Elysium Management for an undisclosed amount.

On September 12, 2019, it was announced that Huddle House will acquire Perkins Restaurant and Bakery.

Geography
Huddle House has locations in Alabama, Arkansas, Florida, Georgia, Illinois, Indiana, Kansas, Kentucky, Louisiana, Maryland, Mississippi, Missouri, Nebraska, New Jersey, North Carolina, North Dakota, Ohio, Oklahoma, Pennsylvania, South Carolina, Tennessee, Texas, Virginia, and West Virginia.

References

External links
 

Companies based in Atlanta
Restaurants in Georgia (U.S. state)
Economy of the Midwestern United States
Economy of the Southeastern United States
Regional restaurant chains in the United States
Fast-food chains of the United States
Restaurants established in 1964
Privately held companies based in Georgia (U.S. state)
1964 establishments in Georgia (U.S. state)
2006 mergers and acquisitions
2012 mergers and acquisitions
2018 mergers and acquisitions
American companies established in 1964